The Electoral Commission is an independent Crown entity set up by the New Zealand Parliament. It is responsible for the administration of parliamentary elections and referendums, promoting compliance with electoral laws, servicing the work of the Representation Commission, and the provision of advice, reports and public education on electoral matters.  The commission also assists electoral agencies of other countries on a reciprocal basis with their electoral events.

Objective of the Electoral Commission
The Electoral Act 1993 defines the objective of the Electoral Commission as

"to administer the electoral system impartially, efficiently, effectively, and in a way that – 
 Facilitates participation in parliamentary democracy; and
 Promotes understanding of the electoral system; and
 Maintains confidence in the administration of the electoral system".

Functions of the Electoral Commission

The functions of the Electoral Commission are defined by law and in summary comprise:
Preparation and conduct of General Elections, by-elections, and referendums
Allocating government monies to registered political parties for radio and television broadcasting
Promoting public awareness of electoral matters through education and information programmes
Giving advice to the Minister and the House of Representatives on electoral matters referred to the commission
Making available information to assist political parties, candidates, and third parties to meet their statutory obligations in respect of electoral matters administered by the commission
Compiling and maintaining electoral rolls (from 1 July 2012).

Independence
The Electoral Commission is an independent Crown entity. The responsible Minister may not direct the commission to give effect to, or have regard to, government policy.

In addition:
 the Governor-General appoints and removes Electoral Commissioners on the recommendation of the House of Representatives 
 the Electoral Commission has a statutory duty to act independently in performing its statutory duties and functions and exercising its powers
 the Electoral Commission may provide information and advice to the Minister of Justice or the House of Representatives at any time and of its own volition.

Electoral Commission Board
The Electoral Commission Board has three members, appointed by the Governor-General, including one member as the Chairperson, one member as the Deputy Chairperson and the Chief Electoral Officer, who is the Chief Executive of the Electoral Commission.

Electoral events conducted by the Electoral Commission

History

Formation of the Electoral Commission
The Electoral (Administration) Amendment Bill, passed unanimously by Parliament 19 May 2010, established a new independent Electoral Commission which was given overarching responsibility to administer elections.

The Electoral Commission, which took over the responsibilities of the Chief Electoral Office and the previous Electoral Commission, was formed on Friday 1 October 2010.

On 1 July 2012 the statutory responsibilities of the Electoral Enrolment Centre of New Zealand Post were transferred to the commission in accordance with the Electoral (Administration) Amendment Act 2011.

Previous Electoral Commission

The previous Electoral Commission of New Zealand (1993–2010) was a governmental body responsible for administering certain aspects of the country's electoral system.

It was an independent Crown entity, not part of any larger department or Ministry, and was established under the Electoral Act 1993. It worked alongside two other bodies, the Chief Electoral Office and the Electoral Enrolment Centre.

The four primary functions of the previous Electoral Commission were:
Registration of political parties. The commission was responsible for scrutinising and approving all changes to the electoral register. A place on the register allows parties to contest the party vote in general elections. Unregistered parties can put forward individual candidates, but cannot receive votes for proportional representation under the MMP system. The commission must have been satisfied that such a party meets the requirements for registration, such as having five hundred financial members.
Allocating broadcasting funding. Political parties are given state funding for any broadcasting they conduct in an election campaign. The commission was responsible for dividing money between the various parties, taking into account a party's membership, current number of MPs, previous election performance, and current polling. The commission also supervises the actual payment of this funding.
Supervision of financial declarations. to ensure transparency, parties are required to submit records showing how much money they received as donations and how much money they spent campaigning. The commission supervised this process.
Public education. The commission was the primary body charged with ensuring strong public awareness of how elections in New Zealand work.

For most business, the previous Electoral Commission consisted of four members – a President, a Chief Executive, the head of the Ministry of Justice, and the Chief Judge of the Māori Land Court.

Two additional members, one appointed by the Government and one by the Opposition, participate in the commission e.g. on the allocation of broadcasting funds. This participation is generally condemned by smaller parties, which claim that Labour and National unfairly monopolised funding. These additional members were removed by Labour in 2007 by the Electoral Finance Act; but the Act was repealed by National in 2009, with clauses of the EFA dealing with donation disclosure inserted into the 1993 Electoral Act.

References

External links
New Zealand Electoral Commission's website
New Zealand Electoral Commission's website for the review of the MMP Voting System
New Zealand Electoral Commission's website for election results

New Zealand
Elections in New Zealand
Constitution of New Zealand
New Zealand independent crown entities
2010 establishments in New Zealand